Fracture is a 2007 psychological legal crime thriller film starring Anthony Hopkins and Ryan Gosling, and directed by Gregory Hoblit. It is the story of a man who shoots his unfaithful wife, and then engages in a battle of wits with a young assistant district attorney.

Plot 
Theodore "Ted" Crawford, a wealthy Irish aeronautical engineer living  in Los Angeles, confirms that his wife, Jennifer, is having an affair with police detective Robert Nunally. Confronting his wife, Crawford shoots her. Police are called, including Nunally, who enters the house cautiously, negotiating with Crawford for both to put down their guns. Crawford confesses he shot his wife. Recognizing the victim, and being subtly goaded by Crawford, Nunally becomes enraged and assaults him.

Now in jail awaiting trial, Crawford engages in a battle of wits with rising star deputy district attorney William "Willy" Beachum, who considers the case an open-and-shut matter and agrees to go to trial immediately. Beachum is preparing to change over from criminal law to a corporate attorneyship at well-known law firm Wooton Sims, and flirts with his future boss, Nikki Gardner.

At the trial, Crawford acts as his own attorney, thereby matching himself, an untrained defendant, against a star prosecutor. Crawford informs the court that the arresting officer (Nunally) was having an affair with his wife, assaulted him during his arrest, and was present during his interrogation. Crawford's confession is therefore ruled inadmissible as evidence, being, as the judge puts it,  fruit of the poisonous tree. Beachum discovers that Crawford's handgun could not have been used in the shooting because it does not match shell casings at the crime scene and in fact has never been fired. This baffles police, since CCTV surveillance was in use during the shooting and until Crawford's arrest, during which time he did not leave the house.

Nunally comes up with a scheme to plant false evidence to implicate Crawford, which Beachum rejects. With no new evidence to present, Beachum has to concede the trial is lost, and Crawford is acquitted. Disgraced, Nunally commits suicide outside the court.

Beachum's future with the prestigious law firm is now in tatters. However, he begins to see his DA job as a means to fight for justice for those such as Crawford's wife. Crawford himself observes the change, commenting sarcastically that Beachum has "found God". This motivates Beachum to continue searching for evidence, almost obsessively. Realizing that Crawford's plan is to dispose of the only eyewitness to the crime, Beachum obtains a court order to keep Jennifer on life support. He arrives at the hospital, but is unable to prevent staff turning off her life support.

A mix-up of cell phones causes Beachum to realize that Nunally and Crawford both used the same type of gun, a .45 caliber Glock 21. He figures out that before the crime Crawford must have switched his and Nunally's guns in the hotel room where Jennifer and Nunally secretly met. Crawford had shot his wife with Nunally's gun, then reloaded it. The detective had arrived on the scene carrying Crawford's gun, and both had put down their weapons as a preliminary move in negotiations. When Nunally had recognized Jennifer, rushing over to her, Crawford had switched the guns again, retrieving his own, unused, weapon. When Crawford had reappeared brandishing his gun, Nunally tackled and assaulted him, before Crawford's arrest. Nunally had then unwittingly holstered the murder weapon, allowing the unused gun to be taken as evidence.

Beachum confronts Crawford with his deductions. With Jennifer now dead, the bullet lodged in her head can now be retrieved and matched with Nunally's gun. Crawford confesses, confident he is protected by the principle of double jeopardy. However, Beachum informs him that by allowing his wife to die, Crawford can now be prosecuted for murder, having previously been tried merely for attempted murder. Since he had taken Jennifer off life support, new charges can be filed against Crawford and a new trial can be held. Crawford is arrested by waiting police.

The film ends with a new trial about to begin, with Beachum prosecuting and Crawford surrounded by a team of highly paid defense attorneys.

Cast 

 Anthony Hopkins as Theodore "Ted" Crawford
 Ryan Gosling as William "Willy" Beachum
 David Strathairn as District Attorney Joe Lobruto
 Rosamund Pike as Nikki Gardner
 Embeth Davidtz as Jennifer Crawford
 Billy Burke as Lt. Rob Nunally
 Cliff Curtis as Detective Flores
 Fiona Shaw as Judge Robinson
 Bob Gunton as Judge Frank Gardner
 Josh Stamberg as Norman Foster
 Xander Berkeley as Judge Moran
 Zoe Kazan as Mona
 Alla Korot as Russian translator

Reception

Box office performance 
Fracture was released on April 20, 2007. It opened in 2443 theaters in the United States and grossed $3.7 million on its opening day and $11 million during its opening weekend, ranking No. 2 with a per theater average of $4508. During its second weekend, it dropped to No. 4 and grossed $6.8 million– $2789 per theater average. During its third weekend, it moved up to No. 3 and made $3.7 million– $1562 per theater average.

Fracture went on to gross $39 million in the United States and Canada, and $52.3 million overseas, for a worldwide total of $92.1 million.

Critical response 

Fracture opened in 2007 to positive reviews from critics. Review aggregator Rotten Tomatoes reports that 72% of critics have given the film a positive review based on 172 reviews and an average rating of 6.5/10. The website's critics consensus states: "Though Fractures plot is somewhat implausible, the onscreen face-off between Gosling and Hopkins overshadows any faults." On Metacritic, the film has a weighted average score of 68 out of 100, based on 35 critics, which indicates "generally favorable reviews". Audiences polled by CinemaScore gave the film an average grade of "A−" on an A+ to F scale.

Peter Rainer of The Christian Science Monitor gave the film a positive review, praising both Hopkins' and Gosling's performances, noting that "although Hopkins obviously has played a variation on this role before, his Ted is more playfully malevolent than Hannibal Lecter ever was". About the film itself, he stated: "The plot's many complications pretty much all add up, which is a rarity these days for a murder mystery. It's possible that audiences don't even care anymore if a film makes sense as long as it's entertaining". Owen Gleiberman of Entertainment Weekly also gave the film a positive review, and like Rainer, he praised the performances of Hopkins and Gosling, noting that "the two actors are terrific". He also stated that "Fracture is working on us, playing us, but that's its pleasure. It makes overwrought manipulation seem more than a basic instinct."

Scott Foundas of The Village Voice gave the film a positive review, praising Gosling's performance, stating: "Gosling is the kind of actor who makes other actors look lazy. He is Brando at the time of Streetcar, or Nicholson in Five Easy Pieces, and altogether one of the more remarkable happenings at the movies today." Claudia Puig of USA Today also gave the film a positive review, praising not only the two leading actors' performances, but also Hoblit's direction, noting that "he also knows how to draw remarkable performances from young actors, with Ed Norton in Primal Fear and Gosling here". She also added about the film that "it's a provocative game that plays out with intelligence and wit." James Berardinelli of ReelViews gave the film three stars out of four, calling the film "gruesomely engaging." William Arnold of Seattle Post-Intelligencer also gave the film a positive review, calling the film "better-than-average", and stated: "It's occasionally quite witty, it's able to tell us a great deal about its characters and their back stories in an economic fashion... its plot swings are surprising and compelling."

Scott Tobias of The A.V. Club gave the film a "B" rating, and also praised Hopkins and Gosling's performances, stating that "not since Lecter has a role been this well suited to Hopkins, whose intelligence and pristine formality as an actor often make him seem alien—or worse, an incorrigible ham. Gosling is equally good in the less showy role of a righteous prosecutor, investing a stock part with as much droll humor and charisma as he can muster." Justin Chang of Variety magazine also gave the film a positive review and stated that the film is "an absorbing legal thriller that can't help but taste like exquisitely reheated leftovers." Philip French of The Guardian wrote that "wily old gander Hopkins running rings around the confident young Gosling is a lot of fun."   Manohla Dargis of The New York Times also positively reviewed Hopkins' and Gosling's performances, writing, "Mr. Hopkins and Mr. Gosling navigate the film’s sleekly burnished surfaces and darkly lighted interiors, its procedural twists and courtroom turns without breaking stride or into a sweat."

Ross Bennett of Empire magazine gave the film three stars out of five and stated that "the two leads are on fine form, but the surrounding structure is too familiar from a thousand other films. Still, tense and occasionally twisty stuff." Wesley Morris of The Boston Globe gave the film a mixed review, stating about the film itself and both Hopkins and Gosling: "You needn't actually see Fracture to know that if the charge is acting that winks, these two are guilty." Pete Vonder Haar of Film Threat gave the film two and a half stars out of four, stating, "Fracture may be smarter than the majority of movies out there, but it's not half as clever as it thinks it is." Richard Schickel of Time magazine, like Bennett, Morris and Vonder Haar, gave the film a mixed review, and stated: "It renders passion dispassionate and turns murder into a kind of fashion statement, something we observe without really caring about."

Accolades 
Fracture was nominated for two awards, a Teen Choice Award for Ryan Gosling in the "Choice Movie Actor" category, and a World Soundtrack Award for Mychael Danna in the "Film Composer of the Year" category.

Home video
The film was released on DVD on August 14, 2007. and on Blu-ray on June 16, 2009.

References

External links

 
 
 

2007 crime drama films
2007 films
2000s legal drama films
2000s psychological drama films
Adultery in films
American courtroom films
American crime drama films
American legal drama films
American psychological drama films
Castle Rock Entertainment films
Films about lawyers
Films about murderers
Films directed by Gregory Hoblit
Films scored by Mychael Danna
Films scored by Jeff Danna
Films set in Los Angeles
German crime drama films
German psychological drama films
New Line Cinema films
Uxoricide in fiction
2000s English-language films
2000s American films
2000s German films
Works about prosecutors